Ernst Forsthoff (13 September 1902, Laar – 13 August 1974, Heidelberg) was a German scholar of constitutional law and a leading theorist of administrative law.

Life
Forsthoff, the son of pastor , was called to teach law at the Johann Wolfgang Goethe-Universität in Frankfurt am Main 1933, at the University of Hamburg in 1935, at the Albertina in Königsberg in 1936 and at the University of Vienna in 1942. There he was forbidden to exercise his teaching post by the Gestapo until 1943, when he was called to the University of Heidelberg.

After the war, he was dismissed from governmental service by order of the American military government, but was able to resume teaching in 1952. Forsthoff was a leading author of the Constitution of Cyprus and was president of the Supreme Constitutional Court of Cyprus from 1960 to 1963.

Thought

In the 1930s, Forsthoff was among the jurists such as Carl Schmitt, Karl Larenz,  and  who endeavoured to legitimise the Nazi regime through their writings. Forsthoff's 1933 paper Der totale Staat (The Total State) advocated a broad understanding of the Führerprinzip as an exclusive and unlimited power of command over all subjects of the state. He himself was unwilling to submit fully to the Nazi state, however, and fell in disfavour with the authorities during the war. In a seminal 1938 paper, he coined the term Daseinsvorsorge, introducing the concept of public services to German legal thinking.

After the war, although now supporting the democratic Rechtsstaat (which he understood as opposed to the Sozialstaat advocated by the Left), Forsthoff continued to support a powerful state subject to only limited judicial constraints and rejected the notion of constitutional rights as a normative framework of society.

Forsthoff was among the few postwar European scholars who maintained adherence to the philosophy of strict legal positivism. His influential textbook Lehrbuch des Verwaltungsrechts (1950) also emphasized the comprehensive responsibility of the state for society, preferring to focus on the functioning of government rather than on its possible failure.

Partial bibliography
 Der totale Staat, Hamburg 1933.
 Deutsche Geschichte seit 1918 in Dokumenten, 1st ed. Leipzig 1935, 2nd ed. 1938, 3rd ed. 1943.
Die Verwaltung als Leistungsträger, Kohlhammer Verlag Stuttgart-Berlin, 1938
 Verfassungsprobleme des Sozialstaates, Münster 1954. 
 als Herausgeber: Rechtsstaatlichkeit und Sozialstaatlichkeit, Darmstadt 1968.
 Der Staat der Industriegesellschaft, München 1971.
 Lehrbuch des Verwaltungsrechts. Bd. I: Allgemeiner Teil, München, 1st ed. 1950, 10th ed. 1973.

References
 Meinel, Florian: Der Jurist in der industriellen Gesellschaft: Ernst Forsthoff und seine Zeit. Berlin: Akademie-Verlag, 2011; .

Further reading 
 Meinel, Florian: "Ernst Forsthoff and the Intellectual History of German Administrative Law", German Law Journal, No. 8 (2007), pp. 785–799.
  (Hg.): Festschrift für Ernst Forsthoff zum 70. Geburtstag. München: C.H. Beck'sche Verlagsbuchhandlung, 1972. 2. Aufl. 1974; .
 Gerhard Mauz: "Ernst Forsthoff und andere...," in:  (Hrsg.): Intellektuelle im Bann des Nationalsozialismus, Hamburg 1980, S. 193-203; .
 Christian Schütte: Progressive Verwaltungsrechtswissenschaft auf konservativer Grundlage: Zur Verwaltungsrechtslehre Ernst Forsthoffs. Berlin: Verlag Duncker & Humblot 2006, .
 Briefwechsel Ernst Forsthoff – Carl Schmitt (1926–1974). Hrsg. von Angela Reinthal, Reinhard Mußgnug & Dorothee Mußgnug, unter Mitarbeit von Gerd Giesler und Jürgen Tröger. Berlin: Akademie Verlag 2007, ;
 Bernd Rüthers: "Überlebende und überlebte Vergangenheiten – Zwei Starjuristen einer Diktatur unter sich," in: myops - Berichte aus der Welt des Rechts, Heft 4 (2008), S. 67-75.

External links 
 

1902 births
1974 deaths
Jurists from Lower Saxony
People from Bentheim
Academic staff of the University of Hamburg
Academic staff of Goethe University Frankfurt
Academic staff of the University of Vienna